Küchler, Kuechler, Kuchler are varying transliterations of a German surname. Notable people with the surname include:

 Albert Küchler (1803–1886), Danish painter associated with the Danish Golden Age
 Alwin H. Küchler (born 1965), German cinematographer
  (born 1944), German politician (SPD)
 Ferdinand Küchler (1867–1937), German violinist and composer
  (1822–1898), German civil servant and Hessian politician
 Georg Karl Friedrich Wilhelm von Küchler (1881–1968), German field marshal
 Jacob Kuechler (1823–1893), surveyor, conscientious objector during the Civil War
 Steven Küchler (born 1975), German boxer
 Tim Küchler (born 1986), German actor

Kuchler 

 A. W. Kuchler, an American geographer and naturalist

German-language surnames